Kristy Dempsey is a children's book author currently living in Belo Horizonte, Brazil. She won the 2015 Golden Kite Award for Picture Book Text on her book A Dance Like Starlight: One Ballerina's Dream.

Early life and non-writing career

Dempsey was born in Lake City, South Carolina She lived in Gastonia, North Carolina, Statesville, North Carolina, Elizabethton, Tennessee, and Greenville, South Carolina as a child. She attended Furman University in Greenville. Later she lived in Carrollton, Georgia. In 1998 she moved to  Belo Horizonte, Brazil.

Dempsey is a Middle School/High School/ Advanced Placement Language and Composition English Teacher and has been a school librarian. She teaches at the American School of Belo Horizonte.

Publications
Me With You (PreS-Grade 1) (Philomel 2009) 
Mini Racer (PreSchool-Grade1) ( Bloomsbury 2011) 
Surfer Chick (Abrams 2012) 
A Dance Like Starlight (Picture book. 3–7) (Philomel 2014) 
Superhero Instruction Manual (Picture book. 4–8) (Knopf 2016) 
Ten Little Toes, Two Small Feet (Picture book. 1–3) (Little Bee 2016) 
Ten Little Fingers, Two Small Hands (Picture book. 1–3)  (Little Bee 2016) 
A Hop is Up  (Picture book. 2–4) (Bloomsbury 2016)  
Papa Put a Man on the Moon (Picture book. 6–8) (Dial Books 2019)

Critical responses

A review of Papa Put a Man on the Moon in Publishers Weekly said:

A review of Papa Put a Man on the Moon in Kirkus Reviews said:

Jasmine L. Precopio writing in School Library Journal said of Papa Put a Man on the Moon:

A starred review of A Dance Like Starlight in Kirkus Reviews said:

Barbara Auerbach writing in School Library Journal said of A Dance Like Starlight:

Ann Kelley, in a starred review of A Dance Like Starlight in Booklist wrote:

Michelle Wardrip, writing in the Statesman Journal said of A Dance Like Starlight:

Carolyn Eubanks, writing in the Petersburg, Virginia Progress-Index said of A Dance Like Starlight:

 
A review of Superhero Instruction Manual in Kirkus Reviews said:

A review of Ten Little Fingers, Two Small Hands  in Kirkus Reviews said:

A review of A Hop is Up in Kirkus Reviews said:

A review of Ten Little Toes, Two Small Feet in Kirkus Reviews said:

Marge Loch-Wouters, writing in School Library Journal, said of Mini Racer:

Randall Enos, writing in Booklist said of Me with You:

Karen MacPherson, writing in the Pittsburgh Post-Gazette described Surfer Chick as "the comically inspiring tale of a gnarly new legend".

References

External links
Official site

Living people
Brazilian children's writers
Brazilian women children's writers
Brazilian women writers
Brazilian writers
Year of birth missing (living people)